Food and Magic is a 1943 short documentary film commissioned by the United States Government during World War II. Food and Magic, was produced by the War Activities Committee of The Motion Picture Industry and it deals with food conservation and healthy eating. It stars Jack Carson as a sideshow barker who informs the crowd about proper wartime food consumption, including conservation and rationing.

Archive
Food and Magic was preserved in 2008 by the Academy Film Archive. The film is part of the Academy War Film Collection, one of the largest collections of World War II era short films held outside government archives.

References

External links

 

1943 short films
American World War II propaganda shorts
American short documentary films
American black-and-white films
1943 documentary films
Black-and-white documentary films
Warner Bros. short films
1940s English-language films
1940s American films